"Arkansas (You Run Deep In Me)" by Wayland Holyfield is one of the official state songs of Arkansas. It was written by Holyfield in 1986 for the state's 150th-anniversary celebration and was named an official "state song" by the Arkansas General Assembly in 1987.  Holyfield played the song at the inauguration of President Bill Clinton in 1993.

Other official Arkansas state songs are "Arkansas", state anthem (state song before 1949 and from 1963 to 1987); "Oh, Arkansas", also written for the state's 150th birthday in 1986, and likewise designated "state song" in 1987; and "The Arkansas Traveler", state historical song (state song from 1949 to 1963). The song was played for the Sign-On and Sign-Off of Arkansas Educational Television Network.

External links
Lyrics & download of "Arkansas (You Run Deep In Me)", from Arkansas Secretary of State's website
Arkansas Code (Section 1-4-116, State songs and anthem)

United States state songs
Symbols of Arkansas
Music of Arkansas
Songs written by Wayland Holyfield
1986 songs
Songs about Arkansas